Mark Bloch may refer to:
 Mark Bloch (artist)
 Mark Bloch (linguist)